The Dying Days is an original novel written by Lance Parkin and based on the long-running British science fiction television series Doctor Who. It was last of the New Adventures range to feature the Doctor and the only one of that range to feature Paul McGann's Eighth Doctor. Thereafter the series centred on the character of Bernice Summerfield. The Dying Days features the classic series monsters, the Ice Warriors and is strongly influenced by The War of the Worlds.

The Conservative MP for Westmorland and Lonsdale, Tim Collins, was reported to have read the book in one sitting on the night of the 1997 General Election so that he could claim to have read the whole New Adventures series whilst the Conservatives were in government.  (In the event, the postponed novel So Vile a Sin was finally published later that month, thus frustrating Collins' claim.)

The Dying Days is one of a number of the New Adventures which is hard to obtain and is often seen on auction websites such as eBay at prices many times the original cover price. This is because when the book was originally published in April 1997, it sold out before its official release date and a reprint was not practical with Virgin losing the Doctor Who license. A new version of The Dying Days with additional material, author's notes and an artwork gallery was presented as an e-book on the BBC website, and was available there from 2002 through 2010.

Plot
In the year 1997, Bernice Summerfield is recovering from the breakdown of her marriage at the Doctor's house on the fictional Allen Road near Adisham in Kent. To her surprise, when the TARDIS arrives it is the Eighth Doctor that steps out. Before Benny can come to terms with the change, a helicopter crash lands nearby, carrying soil samples from Mars and a prisoner, astronaut Alex Christian, who has been incarcerated since he killed the crew of a British Mars mission. Or so everyone thought. In reality, his crew were killed by Ice Warriors and his imprisonment was part of a deal negotiated between the British government and the Martian authorities. Since then, there have been no further missions to Mars, but now Britain has sent a new mission back to the planet. British astronauts land on Mars where they intrude on the tomb of an Ice Lord. The Ice Warrior Xznaal arrives on Earth with the pretence of vengeance, but is secretly in league with the British Science Minister, Lord Greyhaven. When the Eighth Doctor interferes with their plans, Xznaal releases a deadly weapon known as the Red Death. This apparently kills the Doctor, leaving Bernice and the Brigadier to deal with the invading Ice Warriors…

Notes
The ending of the book implies that Bernice has sex with the Eighth Doctor, marking the first time in licensed Doctor Who fiction that such relations occur between the Doctor and one of his companions. The scene also includes a statement by the Doctor that Bernice is his longest-serving companion.
Chapter two features a cameo appearance from an elderly character introduced halfway through a sentence as "-ermass", and subsequently referred to as "Professor" and "Bernard" during his brief appearance. Parkin confirmed in his notes accompanying the later e-book release that this was a deliberate cameo from television science-fiction character Professor Bernard Quatermass, specifically the John Mills version from the 1979 serial Quatermass.

References

External links
The Whoniverse's review on The Dying Days

1997 British novels
Fiction set in 1997
1997 science fiction novels
Eighth Doctor novels
Virgin New Adventures
Novels by Lance Parkin
Novels set on Mars
British science fiction novels